The Venturer-class minesweepers were naval trawlers converted from fishing trawlers to minesweeper service for the Royal Navy in 1978.

There were 2 members of the class: 
  - originally Suffolk Harvester
  - originally Suffolk Monarch

They reverted to their former names and owner in November 1983 and were converted into oil rig safety/standby vessels.

References
 

Mine warfare vessel classes
Ship classes of the Royal Navy